Frédéric Dumas (14 January 1913 – 26 July 1991) was a French writer. He was part of a team of three, with Jacques-Yves Cousteau and Philippe Tailliez, who had a passion for diving, and developed the diving regulator with the aid of the engineer Émile Gagnan. Dumas participated with Cousteau in the discovery of deep sea reliefs and flora and fauna of deep sea life and in bringing it to the attention of the general public.

Biography
Frédéric Dumas was born on 14 January 1913 in Albi.

A pioneer of underwater fishing on the French Riviera, he met Jacques-Yves Cousteau and Philippe Tailliez in 1937 and his exploits served as a subject in the first Cousteau film "Par dix-huit mètres de fond" ("Eighteen meters deep"), made in 1942.

Cousteau again chose him as an "actor" when he made his second film, "Epaves" ("Wrecks") in 1943, the first film featuring the new Cousteau-Gagnan aqua-lung.

Dumas was a dive leader aboard the RV Calypso, and co-author or actor in many films and stories from the Cousteau team.

In 1953 he co-authored with Cousteau the book The Silent World: A Story of Undersea Discovery and Adventure. It was their first book. In 1956 he was one of the principal architects of the ground-breaking film The Silent World, in which his ballet with the grouper Ulysses (Jojo in French) is famous.

From 1945 to 1965, Dumas was also a civilian collaborator in the French Navy's  (GRS or Underwater Research Group), which was set up by Cousteau and Taillez. It later became the Groupe d'Études et de Recherches Sous-Marines (GERS or Undersea Study and Research Group) and is nowadays known as CEllule Plongée Humaine et Intervention Sous la MER (CEPHISMER or Human Diving and Underwater Intervention Cell).

In 1946, Cousteau and Dumas dove into the Fountain of Vaucluse, a mysterious spring in the village of Vaucluse, hoping to discover the secret of its yearly flooding.  Maurice Fargues was the operation's surface commander, in charge of the guide rope which allowed Cousteau and Dumas to communicate with the surface.  When Cousteau and Dumas became affected by carbon monoxide in their air cylinders, Fargues saved their lives by pulling them back up to the surface.

Dumas was one of the major players in the rescue of Professor Jacques Piccard's bathyscaphe, the FNRS II, during the 1949 expedition in Dakar. Thanks to this rescue, the French Navy could use the bathyscaphe's sphere in creating the FNRS III.

He was a founding member of the Sea Research Society and served on the Society's Board of Advisors. In 1972 Dumas participated in the creation of the research/professional degree of Doctor of Marine Histories.

After he retired from the GERS, he devoted himself particularly to undersea archaeology and was chairman of the archaeology committee of the Confédération Mondiale des Activités Subaquatiques (CMAS or World Underwater Activities Federation) and the Fédération Française d'Études et de Sports Sous-Marins (FFESSM, French Undersea Studies and Sports Federation).

Frédéric Dumas died on 26 July 1991 in Toulon at the age of 78.

Quotations
"Frédéric Dumas had a reputation as a great spearfisherman. He surprised the landsmen when he came out of the water with huge fishes on the end of his spear. There was no pollution along the coast then." Philippe Tailliez.
"It was the period of the Dolce Vita, before 1936. We could hear the war approaching, but our common passion was merely more strengthened. The climate of the Côte d'Azur, like California, allowed Dumas to live in this way-out standard, a kind of hippie before the hour.  Following Dumas, I proposed one day to Cousteau to meet Frédéric Dumas. This is how the team was formed."
"Dumas was the god of water, he did what none of us could do, not by sensibility, but by nature, by philosophy. He played with it.".

Museum

Publications 

 Deep-water Archaeology. London: Routledge and Kegan Paul (1962).
Épaves antiques. Introduction à l'archéologie sous marine méditerranéenne. Paris. (1964).

References

External links
 
 Sanary sur Mer Rétro: Frédéric Dumas  
 Frédéric Dumas International Diving Museum 
 Quelques photos du Musée 

1913 births
1991 deaths
French non-fiction writers
French underwater divers
Sportspeople from Albi
Underwater diving pioneers
French male non-fiction writers
History of scuba diving
20th-century non-fiction writers
20th-century French male writers